It's a Date is an Australian ensemble comedy series which began screening on ABC1 on 15 August 2013. The eight-part series was written by comedian Peter Helliar and directed by Helliar and Jonathan Brough. The first series was produced by Laura Waters. Each episode poses a question about dating—such as 'should you date a friend's ex?'—and follows two sets of people as they grapple with the question.

Season 1 Cast

Episode 1
 Peter Helliar as Greg
 Lisa McCune as Em
 Dave Lawson as Patrick
 Poh Ling Yeow as Jasmine

Episode 2
 John Wood as Rex
 Denise Scott as Gwen
 Sibylla Budd as Imogen
 Luke McGregor as Kevin
 Ed Kavalee as Brent

Episode 3
 Asher Keddie as Verity 
 Stephen Curry as Jason
 Eva Lazzaro as Lucy
 Louis Corbett as Richard

Episode 4
 Kate Ritchie as Zara
 Nadine Garner as Eve
 Kate McLennan as Jessica
 Nazeem Hussain as Ashraf

Episode 5
 Shane Jacobson as Hugo
 Pia Miranda as Shrek 
 Ronny Chieng as Winston
 Emily Taheny as Manda

Episode 6
 Jess Harris as Virginia
 Sophie Lowe as Vicky
 Ryan Shelton as Ben
 Daniel Wyllie as Kane

Episode 7
 Sophie Cusworth as Sam
 Ron Jacobson as Doug
 Jackie Kelleher as Josie
 Lawrence Mooney as The Pig
 Sally-Anne Upton as Brenda

Episode 8
 Ross Noble as John
 Peter Rowsthorn as Michael
 Ian Smith as Don
 Heidi Valkenburg as Alison

Season 2 Cast

Episode 1
 Roy Billing as Graham
 Kat Stewart as Jen
 Matt Okine as George
 Celia Pacquola as Cynthia

Episode 2
 Rove McManus as Declan
 Adrienne Pickering as Tess
 Shaun Micallef as Roland
 Veronica Milsom as Sue
 Dan Wyllie as Kane

Episode 3
 Ronny Chieng as Winston
 Emily Taheny as Manda
 Justine Clarke as Amy
 Phil Lloyd as Brad

Peter Helliar (as Greg) appears as Brad's brother.

Episode 4
 Lachy Hulme as Rory
 Magda Szubanski as Mary-Angela
 Steen Raskopoulos as Juzzy
 Tegan Higginbotham as Abby

Episode 5
 Susie Porter as Jocelyn
 Rhys Darby as Craig
 Tasma Walton as Paulina
 Sam Simmons as Ray

Episode 6
 Jimeoin as Terry
 Deborah Mailman as Joanne
 Eddie Perfect as Jeremy
 Amber Clayton as Freja

Episode 7
 Bridie Carter as Sharna
 Vince Colosimo as Harry
 Aaron Pedersen as Matt/Ajuna
 Roz Hammond as Lizzie

Episode 8
 Tom Ballard as Mark
 Joel Creasey as Tom
 Malorie O'Neill as Natalie
 Toby Wallace as Nathan

Episodes

Season 1

Season 2

Reception
Critical response was more positive than not. Rob Moran felt that It's a Date opted "for star power and broad gags" over quality, but Debi Enkar felt that the series was warm, and Kylie Northover wrote that "while some of the humour tends towards broad ockerism, there are some poignant moments and some acutely observed truisms."

Spin-off

A spin-off series based on characters Greg (Peter Helliar) & Em (Lisa McCune) will on air Network Ten in 2018. This series see them been married for 13 years but have lost their spark, as they try to work things out things happening around them make it more complicated.

See also
List of Australian television series
List of Australian Broadcasting Corporation programs

References

External links
 

2013 Australian television series debuts
Australian Broadcasting Corporation original programming
Australian comedy television series
Television shows set in Melbourne